Joshua Manfred O'Brien (born 7 February 2003) is an Irish professional footballer who plays as a defender for  club Salford City.

Early life
O'Brien was born in Dublin, but moved to the United States at ten weeks old due to a change in his father's job. His father is Irish and his mother, Nicole, is German. He has four brothers; Aran represented Santa Clara University and Ethan played for the University of Notre Dame. He was educated at Eastside Catholic and Archbishop Mitty schools in Washington state.

Career
O'Brien began his career with the Crossfire academy, though moved to Northern California to join developmental team De Anza Force in 2020. He attended the University of Washington, but in 2021 put his studies on hold to join English Premier League club Watford on a one-year contract (with the option of a further year) following a successful trial. He had been recommended to the club by the brother of Northern Ireland international George Saville. He was released in the summer of 2022 and joined the development squad at Salford City of EFL League Two. He made his senior debut for the club on 30 August 2022, playing the full ninety minutes of a 2–1 win over Liverpool U21 at Moor Lane, and his first league start came against Northampton Town, keeping a clean sheet in a 1–0 win at Sixfields. On 12 December he joined Telford United on loan.

Career statistics

References

2003 births
Living people
Association footballers from Dublin (city)
Republic of Ireland association footballers
Association football defenders
Salford City F.C. players
English Football League players
University of Washington alumni
Republic of Ireland expatriate association footballers
Expatriate soccer players in the United States
Expatriate footballers in England
Irish people of German descent
AFC Telford United players
American soccer players
De Anza Force players